Galina Yakovlevna Shamray (also known as Galina Rudko, Galina Ilyina after marriages; October 5, 1931 – February 12, 2022) was a retired Soviet gymnast. In 1954, she became the first women's all-around World Champion from the USSR.

Personal life 
Shamrai was born on October 5, 1931, in Tashkent, USSR. She graduated from the Lenin Pedagogical Institute of the Moscow Region. She married Anatoli Ilyin, who played for Spartak and became an Olympic champion in football at the 1956 Summer Olympics.

Career 
Shamrai trained at the Iskra club and later at the Burevestnik sports society in Moscow. She began competing at the USSR Championships in 1950, where she placed eighth in the all-around. She was added to the team roster for the 1952 Summer Olympics, which was the first Olympic performance for Soviet athletes. Shamrai did not compete in the event finals, but was 8th in the all-around, contributing to the team's gold. She also won the team's silver in the portable apparatus event. In December of the same year, Shamrai earned the silver medal on the floor exercise at the USSR Championships. She placed fourth in the all-around at the Nationals in 1953.

At the 1954 World Championships she won the all-around title, a gold medal in the team competition, a silver on bars and the team's silver in the portable apparatus. She earned one more gold medal on the balance beam, at the 1955 Nationals, and retired in 1956. In 1957, Shamrai was awarded the Order of the Badge of Honor. She worked as a coach at the Spartak club in Moscow and began judging at international gymnastics events in 1975.

Achievements (non-Olympic)

References

External links
Galina Shamrai at the International Federation of Gymnastics
List of competitive results at Gymn Forum

1931 births
2022 deaths
Uzbekistani female artistic gymnasts
Soviet female artistic gymnasts
Olympic gold medalists for the Soviet Union
Olympic silver medalists for the Soviet Union
Olympic gymnasts of the Soviet Union
Gymnasts at the 1952 Summer Olympics
Burevestnik (sports society) athletes
World champion gymnasts
Medalists at the World Artistic Gymnastics Championships
Sportspeople from Tashkent
Olympic medalists in gymnastics
Honoured Masters of Sport of the USSR
Medalists at the 1952 Summer Olympics